The Hsinchu City Government (HCCG) is the municipal government of Hsinchu City, Taiwan.

History
After the handover of Taiwan from Japan to the Republic of China in October 1945, the Hsinchu Prefecture Caretaker Commission was established on 9 November the same year. On 17 November 1945, the commission was renamed Hsinchu Municipal Hall and subsequently was succeeded by Hsinchu City Government. The city government moved to the former prefectural administration offices. In 1955, the city government moved again from the former East District Office on Zhongzheng Road to the former high school on Linsen Road.

Organization

Government's Departments and Highest-Level Affiliated Institutions
 Department of Civil Affairs
 Department of Finance
 Department of Economic Development
 Department of Education
 Department of Public Works
 Department of Transportation
 Department of Urban Development
 Department of Social Affairs
 Department of Labor Affairs
 Department of Land administration
 Department of General Affairs
 Department of City Marketing
 Department of Personnel
 Department of Budget, Accounting and Statistics
 Department of Civil Service Ethics
 Police Bureau
 Public Health Bureau
 Local Tax Bureau
 Environmental Protection Bureau
 Fire Bureau
 Cultural Affairs Bureau

District Offices, Subsidiary and Affiliated Institutions
 East District Office
 North District Office
 Xiangshan District Office
 East District Household Registration Office
 North District Household Registration Office
 Xiangshan District Household Registration Office
 East District Public Health Center
 North District Public Health Center
 Xiangshan District Public Health Center
 Land Office
 Mortuary Services Office
 Family Education Center
 Zoo
 Stadium

Access
The city hall is accessible within walking distance north west from Hsinchu Station of Taiwan Railways Administration.

See also
 Hsinchu City Council

References

External links

 

Hsinchu
Local governments of the Republic of China